Char Bagh is an area within Laghman Province, Afghanistan and is observable from the Jalalabad-Kabul Road.

History
According to some sources, when Alexander the Great entered the region, he built a town between Char Bagh and Mandrawar after the Greek god of victory.

See also
Cophen campaign

References

Laghman Province
History of Laghman Province
Hellenistic sites in Afghanistan